The Indian honours system is the system of awards given to individuals for a variety of services to the Republic of India. The categories of awards are as follows:

Civilian awards

Bharat Ratna

The Bharat Ratna, the highest civilian award of India, was instituted in the year 1954. Any person without distinction of race, occupation, position, gender or religion is eligible for this award. It is awarded in recognition of exceptional service or performance of the highest order in any field of human endeavor. On conferment of the award, the recipient receives a Sanad (certificate) signed by the President and a medallion.

Padma awards

Padma Awards were instituted in the year 1954. Except for brief interruptions during the years 1978 to 1979 and 1993 to 1997, these awards have been announced every year on Republic Day. The award is given in three categories: Padma Vibhushan, Padma Bhushan and Padma Shri, in decreasing order of precedence.

 Padma Vibhushan is awarded for "exceptional and distinguished service". Padma Vibhushan is the second (2nd)- highest civilian award in India. 

 Padma Bhushan is awarded for "distinguished service of a high order". Padma Bhushan is the third (3rd)- highest civilian award in India.

 Padma Shri is awarded for "distinguished service". Padma Shri is the fourth (4th)- highest civilian award in India.

Unlike national honours, the Padma awards do not include cash allowances, benefits, or special concessions in rail/air travel. Per a December 1995 judgment of the Supreme Court of India, no titles or honorifics are associated with the Bharat Ratna or any of the Padma awards; honourees cannot use them or their initials as suffixes, prefixes or pre- and post-nominals attached to the awardee's name. This includes any such use on letterheads, invitation cards, posters, books etc. In the case of any misuse, the awardee will forfeit the award, and he or she is cautioned against any such misuse upon receiving the honour.

 The decoration comprises a sanad (Certificate) issued under the hand and seal of the President and a medal.

 The recipients are also given a replica of the medal, which they can wear during any ceremonial/State functions etc., if they desire.

 A commemorative brochure giving out brief details in respect of each award winner is also released on the day of the investiture ceremony.

Selection process

These awards seek to recognize work of any distinction, and is given for distinguished and exceptional achievements/service in all fields of activities/disciplines, such as art, literature and education, sports, medicine, social work, science and engineering, public affairs, civil service, trade and industry, etc. All persons without distinction of race, occupation, position or sex are eligible for these awards.

In 2015, the government decided to end the practice of ministers recommending names for Padma awards and replaced it with any Indian citizen recommending a person for Padma awards online. The government said that this was done with the belief that every citizen has something to contribute to the nation and that contribution should be integrated with the country's growth. Accordingly, several hitherto unknown citizens were awarded Padma awards in 2017. The role of the state governments was also minimised.

Annulment of awards

While there are no specific criteria for withdrawing a Padma award, the President of India, per the awards' statutes, may cancel and annul any award in the case of any misconduct committed by the recipient. At least three awards of the Padma Shri have been so annulled, twice in 1958 for recipients residing in the state of Punjab and once in 1974 for a recipient residing in the state of Gujarat.

Military awards

Since 11 July 2019, the Indian Army allows close relatives of deceased military personnel to wear their medals on the right side of the chest while attending homage ceremonies at war memorials, cemeteries and funerals.

Wartime gallantry awards

Established on 26 January 1950 with retrospective effect from 15 August 1947.

Param Vir Chakra — Highest-military award in India. Awarded for national bravery in the presence of the enemy. This is the equivalent of the Victoria Cross, which was last conferred on Indians in World War II.

Maha Vir Chakra – Maha Vir Chakra is the second-highest military decoration in India and is awarded for acts of conspicuous gallantry in the presence of the enemy, whether on land, at sea or in the air. 

Vir Chakra – Third in precedence in the awards for wartime gallantry.

Peacetime awards

 Ashoka Chakra 
 Kirti Chakra
 Shaurya Chakra

These awards were instituted on 4 January 1952. These awards were renamed on 27 January 1967 as Ashoka Chakra, Kirti Chakra and Shaurya Chakra from Ashoka Chakra (Class I), Ashoka Chakra (Class II) and Ashoka Chakra (Class III) respectively.

Wartime/peacetime service awards

Sena Medal (Army), 
Nau Sena Medal (Navy) and 
Vayu Sena Medal (Air Force).

Wartime distinguished service

Sarvottam Yudh Seva Medal
Uttam Yudh Seva Medal
Yudh Seva Medal

Peacetime distinguished service

Param Vishisht Seva Medal
Ati Vishisht Seva Medal
Vishisht Seva Medal 

They were established on January 26, 1960

Other national awards

 Prime Minister’s Awards for Excellence in Public Administration is awarded to acknowledge, recognize and reward the extraordinary and innovative work done by the Indian Civil Servants.
 Netaji Subhash Chandra Bose Aapda Prabandhan Puraskar is an Indian National Award for disaster management those who served selfless service for the country. 
 Sardar Patel National Unity Award is awarded to persons who make contributions to promote national unity and integrity.
 Champions of Change by Swachh Bharat Mission and NITI Aayog

Women

 Nari Shakti Puraskar. It was instituted in 1999 under the title of Shree Shakti Puraskar by the Government of India.

Children

Pradhan Mantri Rashtriya Bal Puraskar 
National Bal Shree Honour
National Child Award for Exceptional Achievement

Medicine awards

 Dr. B. C. Roy Award - Highest award in the field of medicine. Instituted by the Medical Council of India, presented by the President of India. Instituted in 1962 by the Government of India.

Literature awards

Jnanpith Award is the highest literary honour Award in Literature of India
Sahitya Akademi Award
Sahitya Akademi Fellowship
Saraswati Samman
Vyas Samman
Bhasha Samman
Sahitya Akademi Translation Prize
Ananda Coomarswamy Fellowship
Premchand Fellowship

Sports awards

 National Sports Awards
Major Dhyan Chand Khel Ratna Award
Arjuna Award
Dhyan Chand Award
Dronacharya award
Maulana Abul Kalam Azad Trophy
Rashtriya Khel Protsahan Puruskar

Adventure awards

Tenzing Norgay National Adventure Award

Cinema and arts

 National Film Awards by Directorate of Film Festivals
 Dadasaheb Phalke Award by Directorate of Film Festivals

Particular awards

Police awards

President's Police Medal for Gallantry
President's Fire Services Medal for Gallantry
President's Correctional Service Medal for Gallantry
President's Home Guards and Civil Defence Medal for Gallantry
Police Medal for Gallantry
Fire Services Medal for Gallantry
Correctional Service Medal for Gallantry
Home Guards and Civil Defence Medal for Gallantry
President's Police Medal for Distinguished Service
President's Fire Services Medal for Distinguished Service
President's Correctional Service Medal for Distinguished Service
President's Home Guards and Civil Defence for Distinguished Service
Police Medal for Meritorious Service
Fire Services Medal for Meritorious Service
Correction Service Medal for Meritorious Service
Home Guards and Civil Defence Medal for Meritorious Service
President's Tatrakshak Medal

Bravery 

National Bravery Award
Bharat Award
Sanjay Chopra Award 
Geeta Chopra Award
Bapu Gaidhani Award
Jeevan Raksha Padak Series of Awards
Sarvottam Jeevan Raksha Padak
Uttam Jeevan Raksha Padak
Jeevan Raksha Padak

Corporate Awards

National Corporate Social Responsibility Awards are given by the President of India. These awards have been instituted by the Ministry of Corporate Affairs. Awards are given in 20 different sub-categories.

See also

 Orders, decorations, and medals of British India
List of people who have declined or renounced Indian honours and decorations

References

External links

Current orders, decorations and medals of India
Genius Indian Achiver's Award

India and the Commonwealth of Nations